Chalkidiki (also spelled Halkidiki, is a peninsula and regional unit of Greece, part of the region of Central Macedonia, in the geographic region of Macedonia in Northern Greece. The autonomous Mount Athos region constitutes the easternmost part of the peninsula, but not of the regional unit.

The capital of Chalkidiki is the town of Polygyros, located in the centre of the peninsula, while the largest town is Nea Moudania. Chalkidiki is a popular summer tourist destination.

Name
Chalkidiki also spelled Halkidiki or Chalcidice was the name given to this peninsula after Chalkida. In ancient times, the area was a colony of the ancient Ionian Greek city-state of Chalcis.

Geography

The Cholomontas mountains lie in the north-central part of Chalkidiki. Chalkidiki consists of a large peninsula in the northwestern Aegean Sea, resembling a hand with three 'fingers' (though in Greek these peninsulas are often referred to as 'legs'). From west to east, these are Kassandra, Sithonia, and Mount Athos, a special polity within Greece known for its monasteries. These "fingers" are separated by two gulfs, the Toronean Gulf and the Singitic Gulf. The Chalkidiki borders on the regional unit of Thessaloniki to the north, and is bounded by the Thermaic Gulf on the west and the Strymonian Gulf on the east.

Its largest towns are Nea Moudania, Nea Kallikrateia and the capital town of Polygyros.

There are several summer resorts on the beaches of all three fingers where other minor towns and villages are located, such as at Yerakini (Gerakina Beach) and Psakoudia in central Chalkidiki, Kallithea, Chanioti and Pefkochori in the Kassandra peninsula, Nikiti and Neos Marmaras (Porto Carras) in the Sithonia peninsula, and Ouranoupolis at Mount Athos.

History

The first Greek settlers in this area came from Chalcis and Eretria, ancient ionian cities in Euboea, around the 8th century BC who founded cities such as Mende, Toroni and Scione a second wave came from Andros in the 6th century BC who founded cities such as Akanthos. The ancient city of Stageira was the birthplace of the great philosopher Aristotle. Chalkidiki was an important theatre of war during the Peloponnesian War between Athens and Sparta. Later, the Greek colonies of the peninsula were conquered by Philip II of Macedon and Chalkidiki became part of Macedonia (ancient kingdom). After the end of the wars between the Macedonians and the Romans, the region became part of the Roman Empire, along with the rest of Greece. At the end of the Roman Republic (in 43 BC) a Roman colony was settled in Cassandreia, which was later (in 30 BC) resettled by Augustus.

During the following centuries, Chalkidiki was part of the Byzantine Empire (East Roman Empire). On a chrysobull of Emperor Basil I, dated 885, the Holy Mountain (Mount Athos) was proclaimed a place of monks, and no laymen or farmers or cattle-breeders were allowed to be settled there. With the support of Nikephoros II Phokas, the Great Lavra monastery was founded soon afterwards. Today, over 2,000 monks from Greece and many other Eastern Orthodox countries, such as Romania, Moldova, Georgia, Bulgaria, Serbia, and Russia, live an ascetic life in Athos, isolated from the rest of the world. Athos with its monasteries has been self-governing ever since.

After a short period of domination by the Latin Kingdom of Thessalonica, the area became again Byzantine until its conquest by the Ottomans in 1430. During the Ottoman period, the peninsula was important for its gold mining. In 1821, the Greek War of Independence started and the Greeks of Chalkidiki revolted under the command of Emmanouel Pappas, a member of Filiki Eteria, and other local fighters. The revolt was progressing slowly and unsystematically. The insurrection was confined to the peninsulas of Mount Athos and Kassandra. One of the main goals was to restrain and detain the coming of the Ottoman army from Istanbul, until the revolution in the south (mainly Peloponnese) became stable. Finally, the revolt resulted in a decisive Ottoman victory at Kassandra. The survivors, among them Papas, were rescued by the Psarian fleet, which took them mainly to Skiathos, Skopelos and Skyros. The Ottomans proceeded in retaliation and many villages were burnt.

Finally, the peninsula was incorporated into the Greek Kingdom in 1912 after the Balkan Wars. Many Greek refugees from East Thrace and Anatolia (modern Turkey) were settled in parts of Chalkidiki after the 1922 Greco-Turkish war, adding to the indigenous Greek population.

In the 1980s, a tourism boom came to Chalkidiki and took over agriculture as the primary industry. In June 2003, at the holiday resort of Porto Carras located in Neos Marmaras, Sithonia, leaders of the European Union presented the first draft of the European Constitution (see History of the European Constitution for developments after this point).

Ancient sites

Acanthus (near Ierissos)
Acrothoi
Aege
Alapta
Aphytis (Afytos)
Apollonia (near Polygyros)
Cleonae (Chalcidice)
Galepsus
Mekyberna
Mende
Neapolis, Chalcidice
Olophyxus
Olynthus
Palaiochori "Neposi" castle
Polichrono
Potidaea
Scione
Scolus
Sermylia (Ormylia)
Stageira
Spartolus
Thyssus
Torone
Treasury of the Acanthians
Xerxes Canal

Archaeology 
In June 2022, archaeologists announced the discovery of a poorly preserved single-edged sabre among the ruins of a monastery on the coast of Chalcidice. Alongside the curved sword, excavators revealed evidence of a fire, a large cache of 14th-century glazed pottery vessels, as well as other weapons, including axes and arrowheads.

Economy

Agriculture 
The peninsula is notable for its olive oil and its green olives production. Also various types of honey and wine are produced.

Tourism 
Chalkidiki has been a popular summer tourist destination since the late 1950s when people from Thessaloniki started spending their summer holidays in the coastal villages. In the beginning tourists rented rooms in the houses of locals. By the 1960s, tourists from Austria and Germany started to visit Chalkidiki more frequently. Since the start of the big tourist boom in the 1970s, the whole region has been captured by tourism. In the region there is a golf course, with plans for four others in the future.

Mining 
Gold was mined in the region during antiquity by Philip II of Macedon and the next rulers. Since 2013, a revival of mining for gold and other minerals has occurred, and a number of concessions have been granted to Eldorado Gold of Canada. Critics claim that mining adversely affects tourism and the environment.

Administration
The Chalkidiki regional unit is subdivided into five municipalities (numbered as in the infobox map):
Aristotelis (2)
Kassandra (4)
Nea Propontida (3)
Polygyros (1)
Sithonia (5)

Prefecture

As a part of Greece's 2011 local government reform, the Chalkidiki regional unit was created out of the former Chalkidiki prefecture; the regional unit has the same territory as the former prefecture. As par of the reforms, Chalkidiki's five municipalities were created by combining former municipalities, which were in turn demoted to municipal units, according to the table below.

Provinces

Before the abolishment of the provinces of Greece in 2006, the Chalkidiki prefecture was subdivided into the following provinces:

Population

As of the 2011 census, the regional unit had a population of 105,908 inhabitants, up from 96,849 inhabitants in the 2001 census. The autonomous monastic state of Mount Athos which is often considered to be geographically part of Chalkidiki recorded an additional 1,811 people in the 2011 census. The population is mostly Eastern Orthodox monks.

Television
TV Halkidiki – Nea Moudania
Super TV – Nea Moudania

Transport
Motorways:
A25 (Thessaloniki, "Macedonia" Airport, Nea Moudania)
Chalkidiki has no railroads or airports.
A bus system, KTEL, serves major municipalities.

In September 2018 it was announced that Line 2 of the Thessaloniki Metro could be extended in the future in order to serve commuters to and from some areas of Chalkidiki.

Notable inhabitants 

Paeonius of Mende (late 5th century BC), sculptor
Philippus of Mende, Plato's student, astronomer
Nicomachus, Aristotle's father
Aristobulus of Cassandreia (375–301 BC), historian, architect
Aristotle (384 BC in Stageira–322 BC), philosopher
Andronicus of Olynthus (c. 370 BC), Phrourarchus of Tyre, appointed by Antigonus
Callisthenes (360–328 BC), historian
Crates of Olynthus, Alexander's hydraulic engineer
Bubalus of Cassandreia (304 BC), keles (horse) competing in the flat race of the Lykaia
Poseidippus of Cassandreia (c. 310–240 BC), comic poet
Erginus (son of Simylus) from Cassandreia, citharede winner in Soteria c. 260 BC
Stamatios Kapsas, revolutionary of the Greek War of Independence (1821–1830)
Xenophon Paionidis (1863–1933), architect
Manolis Mitsias, singer
Sokratis Malamas (1957 in Sykia), singer
Paola Foka (1982 Sykia), singer

See also 
 Chalkidian League
 List of settlements in Chalkidiki
 Mount Athos
 Petralona cave
 Vavdos Folklore Collection

Notes

References

External links

 
Peninsulas of Greece
Prefectures of Greece
Regional units of Central Macedonia
Geography of ancient Macedonia
Wine regions of Greece